Kellys Cross-Cumberland was a provincial electoral district for the Legislative Assembly of Prince Edward Island, Canada. It was previously known as Crapaud-Hazel Grove. It was the first provincial constituency to elect a member of the Green Party, and only the second provincial constituency to elect a member of any third party. Peter Bevan-Baker defeated the Liberal candidate Valerie Docherty in the provincial election on May 4, 2015.

Members
The riding has elected the following Members of the Legislative Assembly:

Election results

Kellys Cross-Cumberland, 2007–2019

2016 electoral reform plebiscite results

Crapaud-Hazel Grove, 1996–2007

References

 Kellys Cross-Cumberland information

Former provincial electoral districts of Prince Edward Island